Damien Emere Covington (December 4, 1972 – November 29, 2002) was a professional American football linebacker in the National Football League. He was a 3rd round selection (96th overall pick) in the 1995 NFL Draft by the Buffalo Bills out of North Carolina State University. He played for the Bills for three seasons (1995–1997). He was killed in an attempted robbery while at a friend's apartment. 

He attended Overbrook High School in Pine Hill, New Jersey.

References

External links

1972 births
2002 deaths
American football linebackers
Players of American football from New Jersey
People from Camden County, New Jersey
NC State Wolfpack football players
Buffalo Bills players
Deaths by firearm in New Jersey
Sportspeople from the Delaware Valley
American murder victims
Male murder victims
People murdered in New Jersey